Anton Wilhelm Ertl (10 September 1654, Munich – c.1715) was a German lawyer and geographer.
right|thumb|Copperplate of the Monastery Ramsau by Johann Ulrich Kraus from the "Churbaierischen Atlas" of Anton Wilhelm Ertl, (1687).
He studied law at Ingolstadt, and from around 1680, worked as a lawyer in the Munich court. He also served as a judge in the jurisdictions of various monasteries in Bavaria (from 1682). In 1705 he received the title of imperial counsellor and was a lawyer of the imperial equestrian order in Suebia.

He was the author of:
 Austriana Regina Arabiae (1688): A novel Ertl dedicated to Prince Joseph I (1678–1711).
  Chur-bayerischer Atlas (1687): An atlas with descriptions of Bavarian places of interest of which a short story accompanies engravings of the pertinent locations (engravings by Johann Ulrich Kraus). 
 Relationes Curiosae Bavaricae (1685): A collection of anecdotes and character portrayals derived from Bavarian history.

References
Leitschuh, Max: Die Matrikeln der Oberklassen des Wilhelmsgymnasiums in München, 4 Bde., München 1970-1976; Bd. 1, S. 197

External links 
 WorldCat Identities Most widely held works by Anton Wilhelm Ertl

1654 births
1715 deaths
German geographers
People from Munich
Jurists from Bavaria
17th-century German lawyers
18th-century German lawyers